The International New Media Gallery (INMG) is an online museum that specialises in moving image and screen-based art. Founded in 2012, the INMG aims to expand and increase the audience for contemporary culture by exhibiting art outside the physical walls of a traditional museum, and providing an educational framework for discussion both online and offline. The INMG is dedicated to exploring current debates and topics in art history: touching on areas such as migration, war, environmental activism and the internet itself. The gallery has had three exhibitions to date: 
Corinne Silva: Wandering Abroad (2012–13)
 Thomson & Craighead: A Short Film About War (2013)
 Amy Balkin: (In)visible Matter (2013–14) 
Planned future exhibitions will include work by Ursula Biemann.

The INMG's curators have described how they were interested in 'blurring' the boundaries between online and offline; explaining that "Our project was never intended to be online only. From the beginning we have considered the hosting of offline events as fundamental to our curatorial practice". The INMG have hosted reading groups and talks at Carroll/Fletcher gallery, Sussex University and UCL; collaborating with groups like the Centre for the Study of Contemporary Art (UCL). Nevertheless, the INMG's online discussion forums are important to the gallery's practice, and have thrown up some interesting questions, such as: "This isn't a gallery, i would argue. what distinguishes it from youtube?". Unlike YouTube, the INMG's exhibitions are curated, not user-generated. However, the gallery's participation programme has launched a project that explores the potential middle ground between the two.

The INMG is also unlike many other online galleries in that it publishes extensive catalogues online, free to download. Its contributors are largely postgraduates or academics, including figures such as TJ Demos and Alan Ingram. The notion of public space or a commons is a re-occurring theme in the catalogues published by the gallery so far. In one, Corinne Silva reflects, "I want the work to have life beyond the physical gallery, so having it on the web and contextualised through the International New Media Gallery is really exciting. I could be really precious and say that I don't want it to be seen on a tiny screen or watched on somebody's phone but I have to trust that the film can carry that". The idea of sharing material online is also the subject of Thomson & Craighead's A Short Film About War (2009): the artists gathered photography from Flickr that was listed under a creative commons license. Comparably, in Demos' discussion with Balkin he observes how her work is often an investigation of ways of creating a space of the commons, through legal interventions or building a collective archive.

References

Virtual art museums and galleries
British websites
Museums established in 2012